La Roda Club de Fútbol is a Spanish football club based in La Roda, in the autonomous community of Castile-La Mancha. Founded in 1999 it plays in Segunda División B – Group 4, holding home games at Estadio Municipal de Deportes, which has a capacity of 3,000 spectators.

History 
In 1999 La Roda CF became the legal successor of Sporting La Roda with Emilio López as its first president.

Season to season

6 seasons in Segunda División B
14 seasons in Tercera División
1 season in Tercera División RFEF

Current squad

References

External links
Official website 
Futbolme team profile 

 
Football clubs in Castilla–La Mancha
Association football clubs established in 1999
1999 establishments in Spain
Province of Albacete